The matter power spectrum describes the density contrast of the universe (the difference between the local density and the mean density) as a function of scale.  It is the Fourier transform of the matter correlation function.  On large scales, gravity competes with cosmic expansion, and structures grow according to linear theory.  In this regime, the density contrast field is Gaussian, Fourier modes evolve independently, and the power spectrum is sufficient to completely describe the density field.  On small scales, gravitational collapse is non-linear, and can only be computed accurately using N-body simulations.  Higher-order statistics are necessary to describe the full field at small scales.

Definition 
Let  represent the matter overdensity, a dimensionless quantity defined as:

where  is the average matter density over all space.

The power spectrum is most commonly understood as the Fourier transform of the autocorrelation function, mathematically defined as:

This then determines the easily derived relationship to the power spectrum, that is 

Equivalently, letting  denote the Fourier transform of the overdensity , the power spectrum is given by the following average over Fourier space:

 

(note that  is not an overdensity but the Dirac delta function).

Since  has dimensions of (length)3, the power spectrum is also sometimes given in terms of the dimensionless function:
.

Development according to gravitational expansion 

If the autocorrelation function describes the probability of a galaxy at a distance  from another galaxy, the matter power spectrum decomposes this probability into characteristic lengths, and its amplitude describes the degree to which each characteristic length contributes to the total over-probability.

The overall shape of the matter power spectrum is best understood in terms of the linear perturbation theory analysis of the growth of structure, which predicts to first order that the power spectrum grows according to:

Determining the primordial  is a question that relates to the physics of inflation. 

The simplest  is the Harrison Zel'dovich spectrum, which characterizes  according to a power law, . More advanced primordial spectra include the use of a transfer function which mediates the transition from the universe being radiation dominated to being matter dominated. 

References 

 
 Theuns, Physical Cosmology
 Michael L. Norman, Simulating Galaxy Clusters 

Physical cosmology